A list of films produced by the Marathi language film industry based in Maharashtra in the year 1994.

1994 releases
A list of Marathi films released in 1994.

References

 
 Marathi
Lists of 1994 films by country or language
1994